Pardoglossum is a monotypic genus of flowering plants belonging to the family Boraginaceae. The only species is Pardoglossum cheirifolium.

Its native range is Mediterranean.

References

Boraginoideae
Boraginaceae genera
Monotypic asterid genera